Iolaus bamptoni is a butterfly in the family Lycaenidae. It is found in Tanzania. The habitat consists of degraded Acacia woodland.

Adults are on wing from January to May.

The larvae feed on Helixanthera tetrapartita.

References

Butterflies described in 1998
Iolaus (butterfly)
Endemic fauna of Tanzania
Butterflies of Africa